The Macon Bacon is a Georgia based wood-bat collegiate summer baseball team that began playing in the Coastal Plain League (CPL) in 2018. They have appeared in the league playoffs twice, and finished as the runner-up after a Championship appearance in their second season.

History 
In 2017, the Macon-Bibb County Commission announced that a Coastal Plain League franchise would be coming to Macon. It would be owned by sports marketing firm SRO Partners, and would begin play in the 2018 season. On July 6, 2017, SRO Partners and Macon-Bibb County signed a ten-year lease agreement for Luther Williams Field, which is currently set to expire on December 31, 2027.

Later in 2017, a contest was announced to select a name for the team. After receiving over 1,500 submissions, five finalists were selected: Macon Bacon, Macon Soul, Macon Hits, Macon Heat, and Macon Noise. A vote was held, with the name Macon Bacon being announced as the winner.

Location 
The team is based in Macon, Georgia and plays its home games at Luther Williams Field in Macon.

Prior to the inaugural 2018 season, the team announced plans to complete major renovations and updates to Luther Williams Field, in partnership with Macon-Bibb County. At a cost of approximately $2.5 million, the renovations would be funded by revenue from the 2016 Special-purpose local-option sales tax (SPLOST).

Further changes were made before the 2019 season and before the 2020 season.

Coaching staff 
Danny Higginbotham managed the team for the 2018 and 2019 seasons. At the end of the 2019 season, he announced plans to leave the team after being named as an Assistant Coach at Des Moines Area Community College. On September 10, 2019, the team named Jimmy Turk, an assistant coach at South Mountain Community College in Phoenix, Arizona as the new manager. On October 2, 2020, the team announced that Kyle MacKinnon had been named the head coach for the 2021 season. On September 21, 2021, the team named former assistant coach Kevin Soine the head coach for the 2022 season.

Attendance 
In 2018, the team was named the Coastal Plain League's Organization of the year after selling out 11 out of 23 home games. It finished the 2018 season 2nd in attendance in the Coastal Plain League and 10th overall for the entire summer league, with an estimated home total attendance count of over 47,000.

Yearly records

Players in the pros 
These former players have been selected in the MLB Draft or have gone on to sign contracts with professional baseball teams:

Post-season appearances 
During their first season in 2018, the team advanced to the league playoffs. On August 5, they were eliminated in the first round after a 4–15 loss to the Savannah Bananas.

In the 2019 season, the team advanced to the League Championship, the Petitt Cup, for the first time, where they faced the Morehead City Marlins in a 3-game series for the Petitt Cup, where they finished as the runner up, losing by a margin of 1–2. Game 1 of the series resulted in a 3–0 loss to Morehead City. In game 2, Macon scored an 11–4 victory over Morehead City. Game 3 resulted in a 2–6 loss by Macon to Morehead City.

During the abbreviated 2020 season, the team advanced to the Coastal Plain League Championship, where they defeated the Savannah Bananas with a score of 6–5.

References

External links
 Macon Bacon
 Coastal Plain League

Coastal Plain League
Amateur baseball teams in Georgia (U.S. state)
Sports in Macon, Georgia
Baseball teams established in 2018
2018 establishments in Georgia (U.S. state)